A Mouthful of Air: Language and Languages, Especially English is a book on linguistics by Anthony Burgess published in 1992.

Topics
Topics covered in the book include: 
 the mechanics of linguistic sounds; 
 the development of the English language, and its connections with other languages; 
 the making of dictionaries; 
 the importance of slang; 
 the International Phonetic Alphabet; 
 the role of dialect; 
 the best way to learn a foreign language; 
 and a look at specific languages, (including Russian, Japanese, and Malay).

References

Books by Anthony Burgess
Linguistics books
1992 non-fiction books
Hutchinson (publisher) books